The following is a list of the oldest extant church in each of the administrative divisions of Mexico. The first place of Christian worship in what would become Mexico was in what is now known as La Antigua, Veracruz, founded by the Spanish in 1519.

Aguascalientes
The Catedral de Aguascalientes completed in 1738. This cathedral is built on the site of a chapel founded in 1575.

Baja California

The Misión Santa Gertrudis was founded in 1751.

Baja California Sur

The Misión de Nuestra Señora de Loreto Conchó founded on 25 October 1697 is considered the "head and mother of all the Spanish missions in Alta and Baja California".

The oldest mission in the Californias was the short-lived Misión San Bruno, established in 1683.

Campeche
In 1540, a church in honor of the Virgen de la Purísima Concepción was begun and it was built upon until 1650. It was expanded between 1758 and 1760. Another tower was added in 1850 and it was elevated to Catedral de Campeche in 1895 during the establishment of the Diocese of Campeche.

Chiapas
The Templo de Santo Domingo de Guzmán in Chiapa de Corzo began construction in 1554.

Chihuahua
The Templo de San Francisco de Asís, built between 1721 and 1741, is the oldest religious building in Chihuahua City.

Coahuila

The Templo de San Esteban dates to 1591.

Colima
The Catedral Basílica Menor de Colima. It has a precursor in a building constructed of wood in 1525.

Durango
The Templo de San Francisco was completed in 1563. The building was partially ruined, but INAH approved its refurbishment. It is located in Nombre de Dios, the first settlement in Durango.

Guanajuato
The Parroquia de San Francisco in Acambaro dates to 1532.

Guerrero
The cathedral of Chilapa has a predecessor from at the very least 1533.

Hidalgo
The Capilla de la Expiración in Tulancingo dates to 1526.

Jalisco
The Guadalajara Cathedral has a predecessor built on the same site in 1541.

México
The Catedral de Texcoco has antecedents beginning in 1526.

Mexico City

The Iglesia de la Inmaculada Concepción in Coyoacán began construction in 1525.

Michoacán
The Capilla de Santa María Magdalena in Tacámbaro is from 1538.

Morelos
Construction on the Cuernavaca Cathedral began in 1529. The building forms part of the World Heritage site Earliest 16th-Century Monasteries on the Slopes of Popocatépetl.

Nayarit
The Templo de Santiago de Compostela has antecedents in the 16th century.

Nuevo León
The Capilla de Doña Mónica Rodríguez in San Pedro Garza García dates to 1661.

Oaxaca
The Templo y Exconvento de San Juan de Dios was completed in 1703. This is where the first mass in Oaxaca was held in 1521.

Puebla

The Convento de San Miguel Arcángel began construction in 1524 and is the oldest of the Monasteries on the slopes of Popocatépetl.

Querétaro

The Iglesia Chiquita in El Marqués dates to 1529. It was founded following the conversion of Otomi leader Conín to Christianity.

Quintana Roo

San Luis Potosí
The Exconvento de San Agustín in Xilitla is from 1557.

Sinaloa
The Parroquia de Nuestra Señora del Rosario from 1731.

Sonora

The Mission San Pedro y San Pablo del Tubutama founded in 1691 by Father Eusebio Francisco Kino.

The first mission was the Mission Nuestra Señora de los Dolores founded in 1687.

Tabasco
The Iglesia de Nuestra Señora de la Asunción in Tacotalpa was completed in 1710.

Tamaulipas
The Iglesia de Nuestra Señora de Las Nieves in Palmillas dates to 1777.

Tlaxcala

Construction on what would become the Catedral de Tlaxcala occurred in the 1530s.

Veracruz
The Parroquia de San José in Xalapa  is from 1535.

Yucatán
The Catedral de Yucatán was built between 1562 and 1599.

Zacatecas
The Zacatecas Cathedral was preceded by two temples, one that began construction in 1568 and another in 1625.

See also
 List of the oldest churches in the United States
 Oldest churches in the world
 List of oldest buildings in the Americas

References

Churches
Oldest
Oldest churches
Churches, Mexico. oldest
Churches